Donzy is a commune in the Nièvre department in central France. It is notable for having mirrored the national voting pattern at every election since 1981.

Demographics

See also
Communes of the Nièvre department

References

Communes of Nièvre